Ganapathi Venkataramana Iyer (3 September 1917 – 21 December 2003) was an Indian film director and actor. He was nicknamed "Kannada Bheeshma". is film Adi Shankaracharya (1983) won four National Film Award, including Best Film, Best Screenplay, Best Cinematography and Best Audiography. He was nominated for Best Film at the Bogotá Film Festival and Swami Vivekananda (1998), for which Mithun Chakraborty won the national award for Best Supporting Actor.

Early life
He was born in 1917 in an orthodox brahmin family in Nanjangud of Mysore district.

Career

He started his career at the age of eight when he joined the Gubbi Veeranna theatre group. His first role as an actor in cinema was in the film Radha Ramana. Besides this he acted in a number of other movies such as Mahakavi Kalidasa, Sodhari, Hemavati, Hari Bhaktha and Bedara Kannapa. He is credited with providing breaks to two of the greatest Kannada actors, Dr. Rajkumar and Narasimha Raju in the movie Bedara Kannappa. Though Raj Kumar had acted in a single scene in a movie previously, the movie Bedara Kannappa where Mr Iyer cast him as the hero, is where he got his break and is regarded generally as his first movie. Iyer also produced the critically acclaimed movie Vamsha Vriksha. Based on an acclaimed novel by S L Bhairappa, it was jointly directed by B V Karanth and Girish Karnad.

He soon started directing his own movies. The movie Hamsageethe (music by Dr. Balamuralikrishna, B. V. Karanth and T.G. Lingappa) was well received and made him famous. Iyer wrote scripts, lyrics and produced and directed many commercial Kannada movies. Iyer's biggest effort was Ranadheera Kanteerava. He continued to make commercial movies until 1970.

In his younger days, he was committed to Gandhi and his ideals. He stopped wearing footwear from the day Gandhi died and never wore them again. He also wore hand-spun clothes colloquially called "Khadi" as was advocated by Gandhi.

He was proficient in both Kannada and Sanskrit and was soon to make the first movie in Sanskrit, about the famous philosopher Adi Shankaracharya (1983). The movie received the National Film Awards for Best Film, Best Screenplay, Best Cinematography and Audiography. It is believed that the movie made a great impact on Iyer.

He later made a film on Madhvacharya in Kannada and Ramanujacharya in Tamil. He also made a remarkable Sanskrit movie Bhagavad Gita (1993), which won Best Film at the National Film Awards of 1993. The film was also nominated for Best Film at the Bogotá Film Festival.

He produced Natyarani Shanthala, a historical television series on the Hoysala Jain queen Shanthala, who was married to a Vaishnava King. It was re-made in Hindi as well as in Kannada. It was based on several works by Samethanahalli Rama Rao in Kannada.

He later went on to make a movie Swami Vivekananda. It was an attempt to portray Swami Vivekananda, realistically. For this film Mithun Chakraborty won a national award for Best Supporting Actor. Mithun Chakraborty played Shri Ramkrishna Paramhansa. Though it had many famous actors such as Mithun Chakraborty, Hema Malini and Sarvadaman Banerjee, the movie failed commercially.

He was planning a film based on the Hindu epic Ramayana, with Sanjay Dutt playing the role of Ravana, before his sudden death on 21 December 2003 at the age of 87. His last rites took place at his Bharadhwaja Ashrama, near Dodda Aladamara, on the outskirts of Bangalore, near Kengeri.

Filmography

Director, Writer and Producer

Actor
 Radha Ramana (1943) 
 Bedara Kannappa (1954)
 Sodari (1955)
 Bhakta Mallikarjuna (1955)
 Sadarame (1956)
 Jagajyothi Basveshwara (1959)
 Ranadheera Kanteerava (1960)
 Kantheredu Nodu (1961)
 Bhoodana (1962)
 Vamsha Vriksha (1971)
 Hemavathi (1977)

Awards

 1983: National Film Award
 Best Film: Adi Shankaracharya
 Best Screenplay: Adi Shankaracharya
1993: National Film Award
 Best Film: Bhagavad Gita
1993: Bhagavad Gita – nominated for Best Film at the Bogotá Film Festival in Golden Precolumbian Circle.
 Filmfare Award for Best Director – Kannada: Hamsa Geethe- 1976
 Filmfare Award for Best Film – Kannada: Vamsha Vriksha- 1972

See also
 List of Indian film directors

References

External links
 

Iyer, GV
Iyer, GV
Iyer, GV
Iyer, GV
Male actors from Mysore
Kannada screenwriters
Filmfare Awards South winners
Indian Sanskrit scholars
Male actors in Kannada cinema
20th-century Indian film directors
Writers from Mysore
20th-century Indian male actors
Film producers from Karnataka
Indian male film actors
Tamil screenwriters
20th-century Indian dramatists and playwrights
Film directors from Karnataka
Screenwriters from Karnataka
Best Original Screenplay National Film Award winners
Directors who won the Best Feature Film National Film Award
20th-century Indian screenwriters